Asad Zarar (born 16 September 1986) is a Pakistani first-class cricketer who played for Faisalabad cricket team.

References

External links
 

1986 births
Living people
Pakistani cricketers
Faisalabad cricketers
Cricketers from Gujranwala